The 1970 NAIA men's ice hockey tournament involved four schools playing in single-elimination bracket to determine the national champion of men's NAIA college ice hockey. The 1970 tournament was the third men's ice hockey tournament to be sponsored by the NAIA.  The tournament began on March 6, 1970, and ended with the championship game on March 7.

Bemidji State, Lake Superior State, and Gustavus Adolphus attended the tournament for the third straight year while Alaska Methodist made the tournament for the first time.  The championship game marked the third straight year that the two ICHA conference rivals Bemidji State College (BSC) and Lake Superior State College (LSSC) met to decide the national title. Bemidji once again defeated Lake Superior State on the Lakers' home ice at Pullar Stadium, Sault Ste. Marie, Michigan.

Bracket
Pullar Stadium, Sault Ste. Marie, Michigan

Note: * denotes overtime period(s)

References

External links 
 NAIA ice hockey

Ice
NAIA Men's Ice Hockey Championship
NAIA Ice Hockey Championship 
NAIA Ice Hockey Championship